Nabot Manasse or Nabot Shiyoma (b. Ovamboland, Namibia — died 30 January 1958) was one of the first seven Ovambo pastors, whom the director of the Finnish Missionary Society, Matti Tarkkanen ordained into priesthood in Oniipa, Ovamboland, on 27 September 1925, with a permission granted by the Bishop of Tampere, Jaakko Gummerus.

The time of Manasse’s birth is not known. He was baptized on 25 December 1908.

Manasse went to the Oniipa seminary during 1922–25. He worked in Onayena during 1925–50 and 1953–58, and in Okankolo during 1950–53.

Manasse was married twice, first to Helena yaKalunduka in 1909–33, and later to Kristina kaNambuli from 1933 on. He had no children.

References

Sources

Namibian Lutheran clergy
Finnish Evangelical Lutheran Mission
Year of birth missing
1958 deaths